The Tristiridae are a family of grasshoppers, in the Orthoptera: suborder Caelifera. Species in this family can be found in the Americas.

Genera
The Orthoptera Species File lists:
 Atacamacridinae Carbonell & A. Mesa, 1972
 Atacamacris Carbonell & Mesa, 1972
 Tristirinae Rehn, 1906
 Elasmoderini Cigliano, 1989
 Elasmoderus Saussure, 1888
 Enodisomacris Cigliano, 1989
 Uretacris Liebermann, 1943
 Tristirini Rehn, 1906
 Bufonacris Walker, 1871
 Circacris Ronderos & Cigliano, 1989
 Crites Rehn, 1942
 Incacris Rehn, 1942
 Moluchacris Rehn, 1942
 Pappacris Uvarov, 1940
 Paracrites Rehn, 1942
 Peplacris Rehn, 1942
 Punacris Rehn, 1942
 Tristira Brunner von Wattenwyl, 1900
 Tropidostethini Giglio-Tos, 1898
 Elysiacris Rehn, 1942
 Eremopachys Brancsik, 1901
 Tebacris Cigliano, 1989
 Tropidostethus Philippi, 1863

References

External links
 
 

Caelifera
Orthoptera families